John de Pilkington was a Member of Parliament in 1316 for Lancashire.

References

13th-century births
14th-century deaths
14th-century English people
English MPs 1316
Members of the Parliament of England (pre-1707) for Lancashire